The 1988 GP Ouest-France was the 52nd edition of the GP Ouest-France cycle race and was held on 23 August 1988. The race started and finished in Plouay. The race was won by Luc Leblanc of the Toshiba team.

General classification

References

1988
1988 in road cycling
1988 in French sport